Thomas Wesley Sewell (April 16, 1906 – July 30, 1956), was an American professional baseball player who played in  with the Chicago Cubs of Major League Baseball. He appeared in one game as a pinch hitter, going hitless in his only at-bat.

Sewell was born in Titus, Alabama, and died in Montgomery, Alabama. He attended the University of Alabama. He was the brother of Baseball Hall of Famer Joe Sewell and of Luke Sewell, and the cousin of Rip Sewell.

External links

Baseball infielders
Chicago Cubs players
Reading Keystones players
Bridgeport Bears (baseball) players
Springfield Ponies players
New Haven Bulldogs players
Alabama Crimson Tide baseball players
Baseball players from Alabama
People from Elmore County, Alabama
1906 births
1956 deaths
Fellows of the American Physical Society